Huguenot House, also known as Homestead Farm and Naudain House, is a historic home located at Taylors Bridge, New Castle County, Delaware.  Historical records from the 19th century suggest it was built about 1711 and certainly before 1725. It is a two-story, four bay brick dwelling with a gable roof.  It has a 2-story, brick addition, which was at one time a separate kitchen.  The house is being restored to its original state by its current owners.

It was listed on the National Register of Historic Places in 1973.

References

External links

Houses on the National Register of Historic Places in Delaware
Houses completed in 1711
Houses in New Castle County, Delaware
Historic American Buildings Survey in Delaware
National Register of Historic Places in New Castle County, Delaware
1711 establishments in Delaware